was a Japanese photographer.

Life and career
Tahara was born in Kyoto. He learned photographic techniques at an early age from his grandfather, a professional photographer.

In 1972, he travelled Europe with Red Buddha Theatre as a lighting and visual technician. While in France, he encountered a sharp, harsh and piercing light that he had never experienced in Japan. Since then, he remained in Paris for next 30 years and started his career as a photographer.

His first series of work “Ville (City)” (1973–1976) captured the unique light in Paris in black-and-white photography. His next series of work “Fenêtre (Windows)” (1973–1980) awarded the best new photographer by Arles International Photography Festival in 1977 and he moved into the limelight. The following year, he started the new series “Portrait” (1978), then “Eclat” (1979–1983) and ”Polaroid” (1984) and received number of awards such as Ihei Kimura award (1985).

His morphological approach to light has extended to sculpture, installations, and other various method crossing over the genre of photography. In 1993, in moat of the Castle of Angers (1993), the first light sculpture in France, "Fighting the Dragon” (1993) was installed.

"Garden of Light" (Eniwa, Hokkaido, 1989) is a representative piece in which light sculptures are installed in a public space covered in snow for six months of the year. The light changes in response to music and presents a space of poetic dimensions. Based on the same concept, "Échos du Lumières" (2000) was installed in the Canal Saint-Martin, commissioned as a public space project by the City of Paris. The spectacle colors from the prisms illuminate the stone wall synchronizing with the sounds.

The rest of his work include a permanent outdoor installation “Niwa (Garden)” (2001) at the Photography Museum in Paris (Maison Européenne de la Photographie), “Portail de Lumière”, an installation created as a part of the cultural project Lille 2004, and “ Light Sculpture” exhibition at Tokyo Metropolitan Teien Art Museum in 2004.

In 2008, Tahara lead the project of building Ginza 888, with the artistic direction of the Museum of Islamic Art. A photography book was published.

He continued to produce a number of light installation projects in urban spaces. He died on 6 June 2017.

Awards
1977 Grand Prix des Rencontres Arles Photographie, France
1978 Prix Kodak de la Critique Photographique en France, France
1984 Japan Professional Photographers Society Prize, Japan
1985 Higashikawa Prize, Japan
1984 Kimura Ihei Award, Japan
1988 Prix Nicéphore Niépce, France
1989 ADC Prize, Japan
1990 Bourse Villa Medicis-Hors les murs, France
1993 Grand Prix de la Château Beychevelle, Franco-Japonaise, France
1993 Chevalier des Arts et des Lettres, France
1994 ADC Prize, Japan
1995 Grand Prix de la Ville de Paris, France
1999 Laureat Project, Vallée de la Chimie, Lyon, France
1999 Concours Festival Lumières, Lyon, France,
2003 Laureat Project, Vallée de la Chimie, Lyon, France
2003 Talents du luxe, prix de l’originalité, Paris, France

References

External links
 Keiichi Tahara 〜Light Scape〜
Keiichi Tahara & Partners Co., Ltd.
Cube Cube

1951 births
2017 deaths
Japanese photographers
People from Kyoto